Twiztid Presents: Year of the Sword is a compilation album performed by various artists of American independent record label Majik Ninja Entertainment. It was released on December 1, 2017 and features performances by the entire MNE roster, including Twiztid, Axe Murder Boyz, Gorilla Voltage, L.A.R.S., Blaze Ya Dead Homie, Lex the Hex Master, The R.O.C., G-Mo Skee, and Boondox.

The album peaked at number 81 on the Billboard 200, at number 34 on the Top R&B/Hip-Hop Albums, at number 25 on the Top Rap Albums, at number 3 on the Independent Albums, and at number 31 on the Top Album Sales.

Track listing

Personnel 
 James Spaniolo – performer (tracks: 1-3, 5-6, 8-20, 29)
 Paul Robert Methric – performer (tracks: 1, 5, 7-14, 16-20, 29)
 Chris Rouleau – performer (tracks: 3, 7, 12-14, 18, 26)
 James "Young Wicked" Garcia – performer (tracks: 6, 8, 12-14, 18, 27)
 Mr. Grey – performer (tracks: 2, 4, 7, 9, 14, 18, 22)
 Waverly Walter Alford III – performer (tracks: 7, 14-16, 18, 21)
 Jaron "G-Mo Skee" Johnson – performer (tracks: 9, 12, 15, 18, 23)
 Mike "Bonez Dubb" Garcia – performer (tracks: 3, 12, 14, 18, 27)
 Cole "ClockworC" Salles – performer (tracks: 2, 4, 11, 18, 22)
 Lex the Hex Master – performer (tracks: 3, 11-12, 18, 25)
 Bryan Jones – performer (tracks: 4, 7, 11, 18, 28)
 Rufus Arthur Johnson – performer (tracks: 14, 18, 21)
 David Hutto – performer (tracks: 4, 16, 18, 24)

Charts

References

External links 
 

2017 albums
Majik Ninja Entertainment albums
Albums produced by Seven (record producer)